Grubišno Polje (Czech: Hrubečné Pole) is a town in Bjelovar-Bilogora County, Croatia.

Demographics
In the 1991 census, the settlement had equal numbers of Serbs and Croatians, but during the Croatian War of Independence the Croatian Serbs were ethnically cleansed, and only part of them returned later in the 1990s.

In the 2001 census, the municipality had 7,523 inhabitants, with the following ethnic makeup:
 4,692 (62.37%) Croats
 1,356 (18.02%) Czechs
 872 (11.56%) Serbs
 228 (3.03%) Hungarians

History
In the late 19th and early 20th century, Grubišno Polje was a district capital in the Bjelovar-Križevci County of the Kingdom of Croatia-Slavonia.

Sights 

The town has a memorial to its deceased from the Croatian War of Independence.

Settlements 

The administrativne area of the Town consists of 24 settlements (as of 2011), namely:

 Dapčevački Brđani, population 50
 Dijakovac, population 32
 Donja Rašenica, population 164
 Gornja Rašenica, population 89
 Grbavac, population 211
 Grubišno Polje, population 2,917
 Ivanovo Selo, population 264
 Lončarica, population 79
 Mala Barna, population 30
 Mala Dapčevica, population 3
 Mala Jasenovača, population 5
 Mala Peratovica, population 65
 Mali Zdenci, population 436
 Munije, population 35
 Orlovac Zdenački, population 285
 Poljani, population 261
 Rastovac, population 40
 Treglava, population 103
 Turčević Polje, population 44
 Velika Barna, population 335
 Velika Dapčevica, population 32
 Velika Jasenovača, population 58
 Velika Peratovica, population 26
 Veliki Zdenci, population 914

References

External links 
  

Cities and towns in Croatia
Populated places in Bjelovar-Bilogora County
Bjelovar-Križevci County